Gone is the fifth studio album by the Australian rock band Beasts of Bourbon, released in 1996.

Track listing

"Saturated" (Words: Charlie Owen, Ian Rilen, Music: Owen) - 3:53
"Fake" (Words: Tex Perkins, Music: Beasts of Bourbon) - 4:07
"Makem Cry" (Words: Perkins, Music: Spencer P. Jones) - 1:48
"Mullett" (Beasts of Bourbon) - 1:36
"Get On" (Words: Perkins, Music: Beasts of Bourbon) - 2:54
"I S'pose" (Words: Perkins, Music: Jones) - 4:08
"What a Way to Live" (Words: Brian Hooper, Music: Owen) - 4:16
"That Sinking Feeling Again" (Words: Owen, Perkins, Music: Owen) - 3:01
"So Long" (Words: Perkins, Music: Hooper) - 3:22
"Is That Love" (Words: Perkins, Music: Owen) - 3:45
"This Day is Over" (Words: Perkins, Music: Owen) - 3:51
"Unfolded" (Music: Jones) - 1:31

Personnel
Tex Perkins - vocals
Spencer P. Jones - guitar
Charlie Owen - guitar, harmonica, tambourine
Brian Hooper - bass
Tony Pola - drums
Technical
Tim Johnston - engineer
Tony Cohen, Tim Johnston - recording
Kristyna Higgins - cover photography

1997 albums
Beasts of Bourbon albums